The drupa is the largest printing equipment exhibition in the world, held every four years by Messe Düsseldorf in Düsseldorf, Germany. The word drupa is a portmanteau of the German words druck und papier; print and paper respectively.

Thousands of industry experts are usually present, and corporate representation typically includes companies such as Agfa Graphics, Océ N.V., Muller Martini, EIZO, Esko, Hewlett-Packard, Xeikon, Flint Group, Heidelberger Druckmaschinen, Manroland, Kern, Pitney Bowes, New Solution, Xerox, Kodak, Canon, Transeomedia, DirectSmile, Konica Minolta, Ricoh, Martin Automatic, Komori Corporation, Fujifilm, Siegwerk, Inspectron and Koenig & Bauer AG. Several new technologies are typically demonstrated during Drupa.

Key data

Theme song
Since 2000 every drupa had its own theme song. The idea started in 1986 with a song featuring a country folk style which was later nominated as one of the worst corporate anthems ever by The Register. Nevertheless, they are one of the drupa trademarks since the theme song concept was resurrected with a dance/pop power ballad in 2000. The drupa 2004 theme song used a techno dance style while the song for 2012 was performed by Dirk Zeisler.

See also 
 IPEX (UK)
 FESPA (EU, South Africa, Mexico, Brasil, China, Turkey)

References

External links
 

Organisations based in Düsseldorf
Printing companies
Printing press manufacturers
Trade fairs in Germany
Tourist attractions in Düsseldorf
Quadrennial events